Galojan is a surname. Notable people with the surname include: 

Anna-Maria Galojan (born 1982), Estonian political scientist
Lilit Galojan (born 1983), Armenian chess Grandmaster